The Magnavox Odyssey 2 (stylized as Magnavox Odyssey²), also known as Philips Odyssey 2, is a second generation home video game console that was released in 1978. It was sold in Europe as the Philips Videopac G7000, in Brazil and Peru as the Philips Odyssey and in Japan as Odyssey2 (オデッセイ2 odessei2). The Odyssey 2 was one of the four major home consoles prior to the 1983 video game market crash, along with Atari 2600, Intellivision and ColecoVision.

In the early 1970s, Magnavox pioneered the home video game industry by successfully bringing the first home console to market, the Odyssey, which was quickly followed by a number of later models, each with a few technological improvements (see Magnavox Odyssey series). In 1978, Magnavox, now a subsidiary of North American Philips, decided to release an all-new successor, Odyssey 2.

In 2009, the video game website IGN named the Odyssey 2 the 21st greatest video game console, out of its list of 25.

Design

The original Odyssey had a number of removable circuit cards that switched between the built-in games. With the Odyssey 2, each game could be a unique experience, with its own background graphics, foreground graphics, gameplay, scoring, and music. The potential was enormous, as an unlimited number of games could be individually purchased; a game player could purchase a library of video games tailored to their own interest. Unlike any other system at that time, the Odyssey 2 included a full alphanumeric membrane keyboard, which was to be used for educational games, selecting options, or programming (Magnavox released a cartridge called Computer Intro! with the intent of teaching simple computer programming).

The Odyssey 2 used the standard joystick design of the 1970s and early 1980s: the original console had a moderately sized silver controller, held in one hand, with a square housing for its eight-direction stick that was manipulated with the other hand. Later releases had a similar black controller, with an 8-pointed star-shaped housing for its eight-direction joystick. In the upper corner of the joystick was a single 'Action' button, silver on the original controllers and red on the black controllers. The games, graphics and packaging were designed by Ron Bradford and Steve Lehner.

During the time of Odyssey 2's manufacturing, some came with controllers that could be plugged and unplugged from the back of the unit via their DB9 connector, while others had their controllers hardwired into the rear of the base unit itself.

One of the strongest points of the system was its speech synthesis unit, which was released as an add-on for speech, music, and sound effects enhancement. The area that the Odyssey 2 may be best remembered for was its pioneering fusion of board and video games: The Master Strategy Series. The first game released was Quest for the Rings!, with gameplay somewhat similar to Dungeons & Dragons, and a storyline reminiscent of J. R. R. Tolkien's The Lord of the Rings. Later, two other games were released in this series, Conquest of the World and The Great Wall Street Fortune Hunt, each with its own gameboard.

Its graphics and few color choices, compared to its biggest competitors at the time—the Atari 2600, Mattel's Intellivision and the Bally Astrocade—were its "weakest point". Of these systems, the Odyssey 2 was listed by Jeff Rovin as being the third in total of sales, and one of the seven major video game suppliers.

Market life

United States
The console sold moderately well in the U.S. Prior to the nationwide release of the Mattel Intellivision in 1980, the console video game market was dominated by the competition between the Odyssey 2 and Atari 2600. It remained one of the three primary consoles from 1980 to mid-1982, though a distant third behind the Atari 2600 and Mattel Intellivision. By 1983 over one million Odyssey 2 units were sold in the U.S. alone.

To sell would-be customers on its resemblance to a home computer, the Odyssey 2 was marketed with phrases such as "The Ultimate Computer Video Game System", "Sync-Sound Action", "True-Reality Synthesization", "On-Screen Digital Readouts" and "a serious educational tool" on the packaging for the console and its game cartridges. All games, aside from Showdown in 2100 AD, produced by Magnavox/Philips ended with an exclamation point, such as K.C. Munchkin! and Killer Bees!.

No third-party game appeared for the Odyssey 2 in the United States until Imagic's Demon Attack in 1983. The lack of third-party support kept the number of new games very limited, but the success of the Philips Videopac G7000 overseas led to two other companies producing games for it: Parker Brothers released Popeye, Frogger, Q*bert and Super Cobra, while Imagic also released Atlantis.

Europe

In Europe, the Odyssey 2 did very well on the market. The console was most widely known as the Philips Videopac G7000, or just the Videopac, although branded variants were released in some areas of Europe under the names Philips Videopac C52, Radiola Jet 25, Schneider 7000, and Siera G7000. Philips, as Magnavox's Dutch parent company, used their own name rather than Magnavox's for European marketing. A rare model, the Philips Videopac G7200, was only released in Europe; it had a built-in black-and-white monitor. Videopac game cartridges are mostly compatible with American Odyssey 2 units, although some games have color differences and a few are completely incompatible, such as Frogger on the European console, being unable to show the second half of the playing field, and Chess on the American model, as the extra hardware module could not work with the console. A number of additional games were released in Europe that never came out in the U.S.

Brazil
In Brazil, the console was released simply as Philips Odyssey (since the original Odyssey had had only a limited release by a local company, Planil Comércio, under license). The Odyssey 2 became much more popular in Brazil than it ever was in the U.S.; tournaments were even held for popular games like K.C.'s Krazy Chase! (Come-Come! in Brazil). Titles of games were translated into Portuguese, sometimes creating a new story, like Pick-axe Pete!, that became Didi na Mina Encantada! (Didi in the Enchanted Mine) referring to Renato Aragão's comedy character, and was one of the most famous Odyssey games in Brazil.

Japan
The Odyssey 2 was released in Japan in December 1982 by Kōton Trading Toitarii Enterprise (コートン・トレーディング・トイタリー・エンタープライズ, a division of DINGU company) under the name オデッセイ２ (odessei2). "Japanese" versions of the Odyssey 2 and its games consisted of the American boxes with katakana stickers on them and cheaply printed black-and-white Japanese manuals. It was apparently not very successful; Japanese Odyssey 2 items are now very difficult to find.

Games

Technical specifications
 CPU
 Intel 8048 8-bit microcontroller running at 5.37 MHz (NTSC) or 5.91 MHz (PAL)
 Memory:
 CPU-internal RAM: 64 bytes
 CPU-external RAM: 128 bytes
 Audio/video RAM: 128 bytes
 BIOS ROM: 1024 bytes
 Video:
 Intel 8244 (NTSC) or 8245 (PAL) custom IC
 160×200 resolution (NTSC)
 16-color fixed palette (8 basic colors - black, blue, green, cyan, red, magenta, yellow and white - with a half-brightness variation (4-bit RGBI)); sprites may only use 8 of these colors
 4 8×8 single-color user-defined sprites; each sprite's color may be set independently
 12 8×8 single-color characters; must be one of the 64 shapes built into the ROM BIOS; can be freely positioned like sprites, but cannot overlap each other; each character's color may be set independently
 4 quad characters; groups of four characters displayed in a row
 9×8 background grid; dots, lines, or solid blocks
 Audio:
 Intel 8244/8245 custom IC
 mono
 24-bit shift register, clockable at 2 frequencies
 noise generator
 NOTE: There is only one 8244/8245 chip in the system, which performs both audio and video functions.
 Input:
 Two 8-way, one-button, digital joysticks. In the first production runs of the Magnavox Odyssey and the Philips 7000, these were removable and replaceable; in later models, they were permanently attached to the console.
 QWERTY-layout membrane keyboard
 Output:
 RF Audio/Video connector
 Péritel/SCART connector (France only Videopac C52)
 Media:
 ROM cartridges, typically 2 KB, 4 KB, or 8 KB in size.

 Expansion modules:
 The Voice: provides speech synthesis and enhanced sound effects. Unlike Intellivoice, games compatible with The Voice did not require it; Danny Goodman of Creative Computing Video & Arcade Games predicted "that eliminates any incentive to buy the $100 voice module".
 Chess Module: the Odyssey 2 did not have enough memory and computing power for a decent implementation of chess on its own, so the C7010 chess module contained a secondary CPU with its own extra memory to run the chess program
 Videopac+/Jopac-compatible only, Microsoft Basic. The rare C7420 Home Computer Module, made available in 1983 by Philips, was a costly extension for the newer Videopac+ and Jopac consoles only. It went with a thick A4 manual, and required an optional external tape recorder to save the programs. This module was the sole valuable justification of the presence of a so-called keyboard, which was supposedly designed to look like a hybrid educational toy, as read in header lines describing earlier this family of pluri-purpose consoles, even in the TV commercials that echoed the slogan written on these brand-new machines: "Video Computer". Unfortunately, this late niche concept, even limited to learning game code contrary to the more professional packaging, could not resist at all the already overwhelming market of the real 8-bit home computers, where the Atari 400 shared the same look in 1979, surprisingly. [The latter was advertised itself: « The affordable home computer that's easy to use even for people who've never used a computer before ».] This expensive module is not to be confused with the cheap cartridge #9: Computer Intro!)

Emulation
An open source console emulator for the Odyssey 2 called O2EM is available. It includes Philips Videopac G7400 emulation among other features. The emulator works on Linux, Microsoft Windows, DOS and other platforms, and is included within OpenEmu for Mac OS X. O2EM (originally not open source) was created in 1997 by computer programmer Daniel Boris and further enhanced by André Rodrigues de la Rocha.

The open source multi-platform multi-system emulator MAME has Odyssey 2 support, and is the only emulator to emulate The Voice expansion module without using sound samples.

See also
 Magnavox Odyssey Series
 Magnavox Odyssey
 Philips Videopac + G7400

References

External links

 Ed Averett – Programmer of 24 game titles for the Odyssey 2.
 The Odyssey2 Homepage! – William Cassidy's Odyssey 2 site.
 Dan Boris's Odyssey 2 Tech Page – technical documents on the Odyssey 2's hardware by the author of O2EM
 Video Game Console Library entry on the Magnavox Odyssey2 / Philips Videopac
 The Dot Eaters article on the history of the Odyssey 2 ("Taking a Journey With the Odyssey²". 9 December 2013.)
 Inside the Magnavox Odyssey² (By Gabriel Torres –  30 April 2012. 8-page feature.)

Odyssey2
Home video game consoles
Philips products
Second-generation video game consoles
1970s in video gaming
1980s in video gaming
1978 in video gaming

Computer-related introductions in 1978
Products introduced in 1978
Products and services discontinued in 1984
Discontinued video game consoles
1970s toys
1980s toys